Adrianus "Janus" Cornelis Theeuwes (4 April 1886 – 7 August 1975) was an archer from the Netherlands. He owned a leather factory (Theeuwes Van de Maade) and was father of seven daughters and one son. His son, Huub, succeeded him. He was born in Gilze en Rijen and died in Tilburg.

He represented his native country at the 1920 Summer Olympics in Antwerp, Belgium. There he won the gold medal in the Men's Team Event (28 m), alongside Joep Packbiers, Piet de Brouwer, Driekske van Bussel, Jo van Gastel, Tiest van Gestel, Janus van Merrienboer, and Theo Willems.

References

External links
 profile

1886 births
1975 deaths
Archers at the 1920 Summer Olympics
Dutch male archers
Olympic archers of the Netherlands
Olympic gold medalists for the Netherlands
Olympic medalists in archery
People from Gilze en Rijen
Medalists at the 1920 Summer Olympics
Sportspeople from North Brabant